Dasht-e Razm-e Musa Arabi (also Romanized as Dasht-e Razm-e Mūsá ‘Arabī; also known as Dasht-e Razm and Dasht-e Zarm) is a village in Javid-e Mahuri Rural District, in the Central District of Mamasani County, Fars Province, Iran. At the 2006 census, its population was 1,003, in 211 families.

References 

Populated places in Mamasani County